Thiodina nicoleti is a species of spider in the family Salticidae, found in Chile. The species was first described by Hercule Nicolet in 1849, as Attus elegans. Eugène Simon transferred it to the genus Thiodina in 1901 using this specific name. However, it was later discovered that Nicholas Hentz had previously described a different species as Attus elegans (now Tutelina elegans), and in 1951 Carl Friedrich Roewer published the replacement name Thiodina nicoleti.

References

Salticidae
Spiders of South America
Spiders described in 1849
Endemic fauna of Chile